Lord Francis Hervey (16 October 1846 – 10 January 1931) was a British barrister and Conservative politician who sat in the House of Commons in two periods between 1874 and 1892.

Background
Hervey was the fourth and youngest son of Frederick Hervey, 2nd Marquess of Bristol and his wife Lady Katherine Isabella Manners, fourth daughter of John Manners, 5th Duke of Rutland. His older brothers were Frederick Hervey, 3rd Marquess of Bristol and Lord Augustus Hervey. He was educated at Eton College, where he won the Newcastle Scholarship, and later Balliol College, Oxford, where he graduated with a Bachelor of Arts in 1869. Hervey was called to the bar by Lincoln's Inn in 1872 and was nominated  an Honorary Fellow of Hertford College, Oxford two years later.

Career
At the 1874 general election Hervey was elected Member of Parliament for Bury St Edmunds and held the seat until 1880. He was elected for the constituency again in 1885 and sat for it until 1892. In the latter year, he was appointed Second Civil Service Commissioner, an office he held until 1907, when he was promoted to First Civil Service Commissioner. Hervey retired from this post in 1909 and maintaining the family's connections with Brighton College, he served as a member of its Council from 1910 to his death. Hervey was Justice of Peace for Suffolk.

References

External links

1846 births
1931 deaths
Alumni of Balliol College, Oxford
Fellows of Hertford College, Oxford
Conservative Party (UK) MPs for English constituencies
UK MPs 1874–1880
UK MPs 1885–1886
UK MPs 1886–1892
Younger sons of marquesses
Francis Hervey
Members of the London School Board
Presidents of the Oxford Union
People educated at Eton College